Mantoida maya, common name little Yucatán mantis, is a species of praying mantis found in Mexico and the U.S. state of Florida.

References
 Dichotomous Key to Species of Mantids that may occur in Florida

M
Mantodea of North America
Insects of Mexico
Insects of the United States
Fauna of the Southeastern United States
Natural history of Yucatán

Fauna of the Yucatán Peninsula

Insects described in 1894